Andreas Obst (born 13 July 1996) is a German professional basketball player for Bayern Munich of the Basketball Bundesliga (BBL) and the EuroLeague.

Professional career
On 14 June 2016 Obst was sent on loan to Gießen 46ers by Brose Bamberg.

On 5 July 2017 he signed with Oettinger Rockets, newcomer in the first tier Basketball Bundesliga.

On 2 June 2018 he signed a three-year deal with Monbus Obradoiro of the Liga ACB.

On 1 July 2019 he signed a two-year deal with ratiopharm Ulm of the Basketball Bundesliga.

On 6 July 2021 he signed with Bayern Munich of the Basketball Bundesliga (BBL).

International career
In 2016, Obst was selected for the German national basketball team, to play in the qualification rounds for the EuroBasket 2017.

References

1996 births
Living people
2019 FIBA Basketball World Cup players
Basketball players at the 2020 Summer Olympics
Brose Bamberg players
FC Bayern Munich basketball players
German expatriate basketball people in Spain
German men's basketball players
Giessen 46ers players
Liga ACB players
Obradoiro CAB players
Olympic basketball players of Germany
Power forwards (basketball)
Ratiopharm Ulm players
Rockets (basketball club) players
Small forwards
Sportspeople from Halle (Saale)